According to Abilities United, over 16% of Americans are considered to have either a physical, developmental, or learning disability. The barriers that 33.7 million persons with disabilities face within the American electoral process include: access to polling information, physical access to polls, current and future laws that deal with the topic, and the moral implications regarding the varying levels of both physical and cognitive disabilities and the act of voting.

Political engagement
Multiple sources report that persons with disabilities comprise one of the most disenfranchised groups within American society. As a result, Americans with both physical and cognitive disabilities are amongst the least politically engaged members of the electorate. For example, during the 2012 election cycle, 11% fewer residents with disabilities turned out to vote than nondisabled Americans. According to a 2013 report written by Rutgers University professor Lisa Schur, as many as three million more citizens with disabilities would have turned out to vote had they voted at the same rate as non-disabled citizens.

Accessibility to polls

Voter identification laws greatly impact accessibility to polls for those with disabilities. As the largest population of citizens without drivers licenses, persons with both physical and cognitive disabilities face the obstacle of strict identification laws at polling places within some states. Within stricter states (see photo below), many disabled persons who do not have physical identification cards are required to submit absentee ballots. The National Conference of State Legislatures (NCSL) provides a web page with ID requirements for voting in each state, and those with the strictest requirements often present the largest challenges to disabled Americans.

A leading theory that attempts to explain the lack of political engagement within disabled communities deals primarily with access to polling places. Many polling places are considered to be nearly entirely inaccessible to persons with disabilities. Oppositely, within the past several years, the Federal Election Commission has reported that more than 20,000 polling places across the nation are not fully accessible for disabled individuals. In 1999, the New York Attorney General stated that fewer than 10% of upstate polling facilities were fully compliant with state and federal laws.

The failure to comply with state and federal laws can manifest itself in many ways, but it typically results in a lack of functional wheelchair ramps, sparse placement of accessible entrance signs, and generally inaccessible physical voting booths. As a result, resources and physical aides such as "Help America Vote Act"-mandated voting machines are utilized for federal elections and aim to assist persons with disabilities.

One of the most popularly utilized methods of combatting these problems in recent years has exhibited itself in the utilization of electronic voting machines. Because "punch card" and "lever" voting machines are often inaccessible to many parts of the disabled community, adaptive technology has been applied to many traditional devices, and many different kinds of accessible machines have been developed. Legislation like the Help America Vote Act has required that at least one accessible machine be available at each polling place.

Contemporary laws protecting suffrage for people with disabilities

Both state and federal legislatures have enacted thousands of pages of legislation regarding the rights of Americans with disabilities. Several major "landmark" pieces of legislation have served as models.

Voting Accessibility for the Elderly and Handicapped Act 

Passed into law in 1984, the Voting Accessibility for the Elderly and Handicapped Act requires polling places to ensure accessibility for all disabled persons during federal elections.

Americans with Disabilities Act 
Passed into law in 1990, the Americans with Disabilities Act of 1990 (or "ADA") is widely considered to be the first major attempt to define the rights of disabled Americans at a federal level. Signed into law by President George H. W. Bush, the act prohibits discrimination based on disability. Though the ADA is wide-ranging in scope, it has had many lasting effects on the suffrage of disabled Americans. Some of the most prominent changes that resulted from the legislation included calls for accessibility within polling stations. This effort to increase accessibility has led to the establishment of mandatory accessible parking, passenger drop off areas, and building entrances at polling places.

Help America Vote Act 
Passed into law in 2002, the Help America Vote Act ("HAVA") creates "mandatory minimum standards for states to follow in several key areas of election administration." Passing both federal legislatures with bipartisan support, the Act authorized the Secretary of Health and Human Services to make polling places accessible to persons with disabilities. The legislation has a particularly sharp focus on individuals affected by visual impairments, and requires each polling station to have to at least one disability-accessible voting machine per federal election. The Act has three main goals: replace punch-card and lever based voting systems, establish the Election Assistance Commission in order to assist with the administration of federal elections, and establish minimum federal election standards

Critics of the Act claim that it's reach should be expanded to more than solely federal elections. While states receive funding for disability-accessible touchscreen electronic voting machines under HAVA, municipalities such as cities and towns do not directly receive funding. As a result, critics claim that the machines are not evenly distributed.

National Voter Registration Act 
The National Voter Registration Act of 1993 attempted to increase the historically low registration rates of minorities and persons with disabilities by requiring both federal and state agencies to assist in voter registration procedures.

Civil Rights of Institutionalized Persons Act 
Passed into law in 1980, the Civil Rights of Institutionalized Persons Act protects the rights of persons in jails, publicly operated nursing homes, and institutions for people with psychiatric or developmental disabilities.

Voting Rights Act 
Originally passed into law in 1965 to combat racial discrimination at polling places, the Voting Rights Act of 1965 has recently supported advances of disabled suffrage. Section 208 of the Act allows citizens affected by "blindness, disability, or the inability to read or write" to assign an individual to help cast votes within a ballot box. Restrictions on the assignment of said individual include the voter's employer or agent of their union.

Contemporary laws restricting suffrage for people with disabilities
In some states, people who are deemed mentally incompetent are not allowed to vote. In the conservatorship process, people can lose their right to vote.

See also
 Voting rights in the United States
 Disability rights movement

References

History of voting rights in the United States
Disability in the United States
Disability rights